Rerun is a 2018 American drama film directed by Alyssa Rallo Bennett and starring Christopher Lloyd.

Cast
Christopher Lloyd
Andrew Bridges
Amelia Dudley
Allison Frasca
Shannon Kronstadt
Danielle Lebron
Tre’von Lyle
Teo Rapp-Olsson
Rishon Salters

Release
The film premiered at the Woodstock Film Festival on October 15, 2018.

Reception
Caryn James of The Hollywood Reporter gave the film a negative review and wrote, "It seems like an act of immense generosity that Christopher Lloyd has added his warm, affecting presence to ReRun, an otherwise pallid and clumsy contemporary spin on It's a Wonderful Life."

References

External links
 
 

American drama films
2018 drama films
2010s English-language films
2010s American films